Daniel Phillip Griffiths (born 1 February 1979) in Carmarthen, Wales is a rugby union player for Bridgend Ravens. He previously played for Whitland RFC and Aviron Bayonnais.  He then played over 150 games for Newport RFC and became the highest all time points scorer for the club in February 2008 at Maesteg.  In doing so, he beat Paul Turner's record which had stood since 1992.  He has also appeared twice for the Newport Gwent Dragons, coming on as a replacement against Munster and the Ospreys in 2005. In June 2010 he joined Bridgend Ravens, later taking up a coaching role, and in November 2012, he was appointed Elite Youth Performance Manager at the Ospreys.

Newport RFC Record

Bridgend Ravens Record

References

External links
Newport Gwent Dragons profile
Newport RFC profile

1979 births
Living people
Rugby union fly-halves
Welsh rugby union players
Dragons RFC players
Newport RFC players
Bridgend RFC players
Rugby union players from Carmarthen